The Electoral district of Glen Iris was an electoral district of the Victorian Legislative Assembly. 
It was created in the redistribution of 1945 when several districts including Boroondara were abolished. Glen Iris was abolished in the 1955 redistribution when several districts including Burwood and Caulfield East were created. Glen Iris was recreated in 1967, replacing Burwood. It was abolished again in 1976, replaced by a recreated Burwood.

Members

Election results

See also
 Parliaments of the Australian states and territories
 List of members of the Victorian Legislative Assembly

References

Former electoral districts of Victoria (Australia)
1945 establishments in Australia
1955 disestablishments in Australia
1967 establishments in Australia
1976 disestablishments in Australia